Pankaj Dubey (born 28 July 1978) is an Indian author, screenwriter, director, producer and social entrepreneur based in Mumbai. He has a Bachelor of Laws degree from Delhi University and a Masters in Applied Communications from Coventry School of Art and Design. Dubey worked for the BBC World Service in London and TV Today Group in New Delhi. He has curated and programmed more than 50 film festivals across India. He was awarded with the Youth Icon Award for Social Entrepreneurship in Gulbarga, Karnataka in 2010 for initiating India's first street film festival for children in slums and villages, the Sadak Chhaap Film Festival. Dubey's debut novel is called What A Loser! in English and Loser kahin ka! in Hindi. Pankaj Dubey is a bilingual author and writes all his titles in English and Hindi. His other novels are 'Ishqiyapa' - To Hell With Love, Love Curry and Trending In Love (Published by Penguin Books India). Pankaj Dubey has been selected amongst three Asian authors for the Writer's Residency in Seoul Art Space Yeonhui, Seoul, South Korea in 2016. He was also awarded with the 'Global Innoventure Award' for literature and storytelling in the House of Lords in September 2018.

Early life

Dubey was born in Ranchi in the Indian state of Jharkhand and grew up in Chaibasa where his father was a professor of English literature. He earned a bachelor's degree in History (Honors) from University of Delhi in 1999. He studied law at Campus Law Centre, Faculty of Law, University of Delhi during 1999–2002, graduating with a Bachelor of Laws. He received a master's degree in Applied Communications from Coventry School of Art and Design, West Midlands, England in 2003.

Work

Pankaj Dubey had a brief background in journalism. He joined BBC World Service in London as a Presenter/Journalist in 2003. Pankaj Dubey debuted as a novelist with What A Loser! in English and Loser kahin ka! in Hindi in 2014. Both titles were National Bestsellers as per Neilsen’s Bestseller List declared on 14 February 2014 and 7 March 20. His second novel Ishqiyapa: To Hell with Love was published by Penguin Books India on 17 September 2015.

Dubey Produced Geelee (Wet Dreams) The film was Directed by Bikas Ranjan Mishra. (2013) He worked as Script and Continuity Supervisor for Disney UTV's 2013 Ghanchakkar, Directed by Raj Kumar Gupta. He worked as Script Supervisor in 'Chauranga''' directed by Bikas Ranjan Mishra.

Dubey producedNaach Ganesh (Dance of Ganesha), Directed by Bikas Ranjan Mishra, again under Sadak Chhaap Films. The film premiered at Busan International Film Festival, South Korea, in 2011.Dubey has curated more than 50 film festivals across India including "Pravasi Film Festival" and "Jagran Film Festival" in 2010 and 2011.Dubey founded a social organization called Society for the Promotion and Inculcation of Human Aspirations (SPRIHA) to work in the area of ‘Empathy Building’ in children by ‘igniting their imagination’ with the help of various media tools in 2002.Dubey made his directorial debut with a short fiction film, Maratha Mandir Theatre (Previously titled as Maratha Mandir Cinema) in 2018, that was nominated for the finals of Filmfare Awards 2018 and was also screened at the 71st Festival De Cannes (2018) in France.

Recognition

Dubey won the Youth Icon Award for Social Entrepreneurship in 2010 in Gulbarga, Karnataka for initiating ‘Sadak Chhaap Film Festival’, India's First Street Film Festival for Children in Slums and Villages. Pankaj Dubey received award from Lit-O-Fest Mumbai 2015 for the Best Hindi fiction for his book Loser Kahin ka! Navodit Lekhak Award by Hindi Akademi, Government of Delhi in 2002 for his story, Mukhauta. Pankaj Dubey has been awarded with the Lit-O-Fest Award for Creative Leadership in Jan'2016. This Award has been conferred to him in recognition of his efforts to increase readership in the hinterland by taking his Book Tour (Ishqiyapa Express) to 20 small towns and cities in India. Pankaj Dubey received the 'Global Innoventure Award' for Literature and Storytelling in the House of Lords, British Parliament, England in Sept'2018.

References

Spriha, India
Looks of a winner, The Hindu 26 February 2014
DU’s North Campus life subject of new film, Indian Express 21 February 2014
Writer’s block is another term for laziness, Deccan Chronicle 22 September 2015
Bhagat was a Big Influence, New Indian Express'' 12 September 2015
Not so easy to Love, HTMediaSyndication 5 September 2015
Manuscripts picked up at Lit-O-Fest 2016  Times of India 22 February 2016
In love with love DNA Syndication 27 April 2016
DNA article on Pankaj Dubey DNA India e-paper 27 April 2016

External links

Pankaj Dubey at Penguin India

1978 births
Film directors from Jharkhand
Screenwriters from Jharkhand
Living people
Delhi University alumni